Phelipara subvittata is a species of beetle in the family Cerambycidae. It was described by Blair in 1933.

References

Agapanthiini
Beetles described in 1933